Sadiel Rojas (born July 16, 1989) is a Dominican-American professional basketball player who plays for UCAM Murcia in the Spanish league. Rojas played college basketball at Oklahoma Wesleyan University where he was the NAIA Division II Player of the Year as a senior in 2010–11.

College career
Rojas played college basketball at Oklahoma Wesleyan University. Averaging a double-double on the season (17.8ppg, 10.3rpg), he helped the school capture the 2009 NAIA Division II National Championship. He and Steve Briggs, the leading scorer of the championships season, were inducted into the OKWU Sports Hall of Fame in October 2016. Rojas received NABC-NAIA Division II Player of the Year honors in his senior season after averaging 25.7 points and 11.9 rebounds a game.

Professional career 
In June 2011, Rojas signed with Leones de Santo Domingo of the Liga Nacional de Baloncesto (LNB).

On November 3, 2011, he was selected by the Maine Red Claws in the fourth round of the 2011 NBA D-League draft. The next day, he was traded to the Fort Wayne Mad Ants. On February 28, 2012, he was waived by the Mad Ants due to injury.

On October 29, 2012, he was re-acquired by the Mad Ants. Following the conclusion of the 2012–13 D-League season, he re-joined Leones de Santo Domingo.

On November 23, 2013, he was again re-acquired by the Mad Ants. Following the conclusion of the 2013–14 D-League season, he re-joined Leones de Santo Domingo.

In July 2014, he joined the Indiana Pacers for the 2014 NBA Summer League. Days later, he signed with Spanish squad UCAM Murcia and had his contract renewed in 2015 and 2016. After averaging 4.6 points and 5.4 rebounds per game in 2019-20, Rojas extended his contract in June 2020.

Rojas competes for the Ants Alumni in The Basketball Tournament. He was a guard on the 2015 team who made it to the semifinals, falling 87-76 to Team 23.

NBA D-League career statistics

Regular season

|-
| style="text-align:left;"| 2011–12
| style="text-align:left;"| Fort Wayne
| 30 || 7 || 17.7 || .456 || .143 || .741 || 5.2 || .2 || 1.0 || .2 || 5.9
|-
| style="text-align:left;"| 2012–13
| style="text-align:left;"| Fort Wayne
| 50 || 2 || 23.3 || .450 || .337 || .701 || 6.2 || 1.1 || 1.3 || .4 || 8.1
|-
| style="text-align:left;"| 2013–14
| style="text-align:left;"| Fort Wayne
| 50 || 37 || 29.7 || .456 || .368 || .758 || 8.6 || 1.1 || 1.7 || .4 || 12.4
|-
| style="text-align:left;"| Career
| style="text-align:left;"| 
| 130 || 46 || 24.4 || .453 || .350 || .740 || 6.9 || .9 || 1.4 || .3 || 9.1
|}

Dominican national team
He has capped for the Dominican national team on many occasions.

References

External links
NBA D-League Profile
Profile at Eurobasket.com
The Wolverine's Uncanny Comeback

1989 births
Living people
American expatriate basketball people in Spain
American men's basketball players
American sportspeople of Dominican Republic descent
Basketball players at the 2019 Pan American Games
Basketball players from Texas
CB Murcia players
Dominican Republic expatriate basketball people in Spain
Dominican Republic men's basketball players
Fort Wayne Mad Ants players
Liga ACB players
Oklahoma Wesleyan Eagles basketball players
Shooting guards
Small forwards
Sportspeople from Fort Worth, Texas
2019 FIBA Basketball World Cup players
Pan American Games competitors for the Dominican Republic